This is a list of equestrian statues in Poland.

Warsaw 
Equestrian Statue of King Jan III Sobieski in the Wilanów Palace park.
Equestrian Statue of Prince Józef Antoni Poniatowski in front of the Presidential Palace by Bertel Thorvaldsen.
Monument to The Polish Cavalry.
Monument to The Polish Hussars.

Bydgoszcz 
Equestrian of King Kazimierz Wielki.

Gdańsk 
John III Sobieski Monument in Gdańsk by Tadeusz Barącz.
Equestrian of Emperor Wilhelm I in front of the Brama Wyżynna (High gate), destroyed.

Jelenia Góra
 Equestrian of Don Quixote and Sancho Panza by Vahan Bego

Katowice 
Equestrian of Field Marshal Piłsudski by Antun Augustinčić.

Komarów-Osada 
Monument to The Polish Cavalry.

Kraków 
Equestrian of General Tadeusz Kościuszko by Leonard Marconi and Antoni Popiel.
Battle of Grunwald Monument (Monument to King Władysław Jagiełło) by Antoni Wiwulski, 1914.

Lublin 
Equestrian of Field Marshal Piłsudski by Jan Raszka.

Marcinkowo Górne 
Equestrian of Prince Leszek Biały by Jakub Juszczyk, 1927.

Odolanów 
Monument to Saint Martin of Tours by Jerzy Sobociński.

Opole 
Monument to Postal Workers killed in action in World War I by Felix Kupsch.

Ostrów Mazowiecka 
Equestrian of Field Marshal Józef Piłsudski by Antoni Pug-Miszewski.

Poznań 
Monument to 15th Poznań Uhlans regiment.

Szczecin 
Equestrian of Bartolomeo Colleoni, the replica of the statue in Venice.
Monument to Emperor Wilhelm I, destroyed.

Wrocław 
Equestrian of King Bolesław Chrobry, 2007.

Zamość 
Equestrian of Hetman Jan Zamoyski by Marian Konieczny.

See also
 List of equestrian statues

 
Statues
Poland